The Bulkeley School is a historic school building at 1 Bulkeley Place at the intersection of Hempstead Street in New London, Connecticut.  It is a High Victorian Gothic stone structure, built in 1871–73 to a design by Leopold Eidlitz, with numerous additions.  It was a private boys high school until 1951, educating generations of city leaders.  

The building was listed the National Register of Historic Places on August 13, 1981, for its architecture and its role in the city's development.   It is now home to the Regional Multicultural Magnet School (RMMS), grades K-5.

Description and history

The Bulkeley School building is located a short way north of downtown New London, on a lot bounded by Huntington Street, Bulkeley Place, Hempstead Street, and Ye Antientist Burial Ground.  The oldest portion of the building forms the western portion, with a larger modern brick structure to the east, overlooking Huntington Street.  The older section is a built out of granite, and is  stories in height with High Victorian Gothic styling.  It has steeply pitched gable roofs covered in multicolored slate, with three-art Gothic arched windows in the large flanking gables, the sections separate by pillars.  A central gable is lower, with a single Gothic window at its center.

The main building design was by Leopold Eidlitz, a prominent New York City architect, and it was completed in 1873.  The Bulkeley School was founded due to a bequest from Leonard H. Bulkeley, a local merchant, for the establishment of a private boys secondary school.  The school was open at no cost to New London students, who had to pass an exam to gain admission.  In 1891 the school began accepting tuition-paying out-of-town students, and its success prompted several rounds of expansion.  It continued to operate as a private school until 1951.  It was then merged into New London's public school system, and was later used to house town offices.  After undergoing significant renovations and expansion, it now houses a local magnet school.

See also
National Register of Historic Places listings in New London County, Connecticut

References

External links

RMMS website

School buildings on the National Register of Historic Places in Connecticut
Gothic Revival architecture in Connecticut
School buildings completed in 1871
Schools in New London County, Connecticut
National Register of Historic Places in New London County, Connecticut
1871 establishments in Connecticut